Jessica A Woolston (born 25 February 2003) is an English cricketer who currently plays for Yorkshire and Northern Diamonds. She plays primarily as a right-arm medium bowler. She previously played for Durham.

Early life
Woolston was born on 25 February 2003 in Stockton-on-Tees, County Durham.

Domestic career
Woolston made her county debut in 2017, for Durham against Cumbria in the Women's County Championship. She went on to play one more match for Durham in the County Championship, scoring 26 against Northumberland. She also appeared in two matches for Durham in the 2017 Women's Twenty20 Cup.

Woolston next played in the 2021 Women's Twenty20 Cup, playing two matches for Yorkshire. She played seven matches for Yorkshire in the 2022 Women's Twenty20 Cup, taking one wicket.

Woolston was named in the Northern Diamonds Academy squad in 2021. She was again named in the Academy squad in 2022, and took 3/12 from 3 overs in a match against Western Storm Academy in July. She was added to the first team squad in September 2022, first being named in a matchday squad on 16 September 2022. She made her debut for Northern Diamonds on 17 September 2022, in the Rachael Heyhoe Flint Trophy against Southern Vipers.

References

External links

Living people
2003 births
Cricketers from Stockton-on-Tees
Durham women cricketers
Yorkshire women cricketers
Northern Diamonds cricketers